Douglas K. Polk (born December 16, 1988) is an American professional poker player. Polk played under the alias WCGRider, specializing in heads-up No Limit hold'em (HUNL).

Early life
Polk was born in Pasadena, California, and has loved strategy games ever since he was five, when his father taught him chess. His family moved from California to Raleigh, North Carolina, during his childhood. In 2007, he graduated from Wakefield High School. At the age of 15, Polk was a competitive Warcraft 3 electronic sports player competing at multiple World Cyber Games tournaments under the name T-Rider before transitioning to poker in college.

Polk is a fan of the Vegas Golden Knights.

Poker career
Polk attended the University of North Carolina Wilmington, but dropped out before graduating to pursue poker full-time. He started playing $0.01/$0.02 stakes at PokerStars and ran a $20 deposit into $10,000. During this time, Polk described himself as a "breakeven rakeback pro".

In 2011, Polk was nearly broke and decided to fully focus on the game. By 2013, he was considered one of the best online cash game players in heads-up no limit hold'em. He played fellow professional poker player Ben "Sauce123" Sulsky in a highly publicized match of 15,000 hands. Polk walked away a $740,000 winner and received an additional $100,000 bonus for winning.

Polk was vocal about Daniel Negreanu's challenge of beating the $25/$50 stakes with two weeks of practice, criticizing him for underestimating his opponents. In mid-2015, Doug started the poker training site Upswing Poker with longtime friend and fellow poker professional Ryan Fee. Polk started a YouTube channel, Doug Polk Poker in 2016.

In 2015, Polk was selected to play heads-up no limit hold'em against A.I. poker bot Claudico, along with professional poker players Dong Kim, Jason Les, and Bjorn Li. Each player was set to play 20,000 hands against Claudico for a team total of 80,000 hands. The human players ended up defeating Claudico for 732,713 chips, with Polk beating the bot for 213,000. The team received a total of $100,000 for the victory.

Polk was involved in an argument with fellow poker player Ben Tollerene over a coaching deal.

In June 2017, Polk won the WSOP One Drop High Roller tournament, outlasting 130 players.

As of September 2017, his total live tournament earnings exceed $9,400,000.

In September 2018, he said he will quit playing poker but continued to add videos to his YouTube channel.

On March 16, 2020, Polk uploaded a video saying he doesn't like the game anymore and is formally quitting the poker industry after retiring from play in late 2018.

In July 2020, Polk challenged Daniel Negreanu to a high-stakes heads-up no-limit hold'em match, and Negreanu accepted. Polk subsequently came out of retirement to practice for the match, and played on HUNL on WSOP.com. The duel ended on February 4, 2021, with Polk winning approximately $1,200,000 over 25,000 hands. He won an additional $530,000 in public side bets, with speculation that there were many more private ones.

Without including side-bets, Polk's combined winnings from his two heads-up challenges exceed $2,000,000. Including public side-bets, they approach $2,600,000.

In 2021, Doug Polk moved to Austin, Texas and has been playing live poker locally. He has made appearances on Texas Card House Live in Austin and The Lodge Live Stream in Round Rock.

References

External links
 Hendon Mob profile

1988 births
American poker players
World Series of Poker bracelet winners
People from Pasadena, California
Living people